Thurow is a surname. Notable people with the surname include:

 Gerhard Thurow (1934–1976), German motorcyclist
 Kerstin Thurow (born 1969), German engineer
 Lester Thurow (1938–2016), American political economist and author
 Roger Thurow, American author and journalist

See also
 Thurlow